= GotoBus =

Travel website

- Type: Privately held company
- Industry: Travel; Technology
- Founded: 2002; 24 years ago
- Headquarters: Arlington, Massachusetts, United States
- Area served: North America; Europe
- Key people: Jimmy Chen
- Number of employees: 25+
- Website: www.gotobus.com

GotoBus is a travel website headquartered in Cambridge, Massachusetts.

The website provides booking services for trains, intercity bus services, sightseeing tours, and lodging in North America and Europe.

== History ==
The company, which operates exclusively online at GotoBus.com, was founded in 2002 by CEO and Cambridge resident Jimmy Chen. In 2011, TakeTours.com was introduced as a spin-off from GotoBus.
